Football Huddle was a Canadian sports talk show television series which aired on CBC Television in 1960.

Premise
This talk show concerned Canadian football topics, particularly college football. Series regulars on the panel were sportscasters Steve Douglas and Fred Sgambati with Lou Agase, who coached the Toronto Argonauts. Various guests were featured on their panel.

Scheduling
This half-hour series was broadcast on Friday evenings at various times from September to December 1960.

References

External links
 

CBC Television original programming
1960 Canadian television series debuts
1960 Canadian television series endings